The yellow-breasted wrasse, Anampses twistii, is a species of wrasse native to the tropical waters of the Indo-Pacific area from the Red Sea to the Tuamoto Islands. It is of minor importance to local commercial fisheries and can be found in the aquarium trade.

Etymology
The specific name honours the Governor-General of the Dutch East Indies from 1851 to 1856 Albertus Jacobus Duymaer van Twist (1809-1887).

References

Westneat, M.W., 2001. Labridae. Wrasses, hogfishes, razorfishes, corises, tuskfishes. p. 3381-3467. In K.E. Carpenter and V. Niem (eds.) FAO species identification guide for fishery purposes. The living marine resources of the Western Central Pacific. Vol. 6. Bony fishes part 4 (Labridae to Latimeriidae), estuarine crocodiles. FAO, Rome.

External links
marinespecies.org
Encyclopedia of Life
 

Yellow-breasted wrasse
Taxa named by Pieter Bleeker
Fish described in 1856